Kenneth Robert Nance (October 1, 1941 – February 14, 2013) was an American politician, lawyer, lobbyist, and legislator.

Born in Mount Carmel, Illinois, Nance moved to Oklahoma with his family. He received his bachelors and law degrees from Oklahoma City University. He practice law and was a lobbyist.
Nance served in the Oklahoma House of Representatives from 1968 to 1978. He unsuccessfully sought the Democratic nomination to be the Oklahoma Attorney General in 1978. He died from a brain tumor in Oklahoma City, Oklahoma.

Notes

1941 births
2013 deaths
Democratic Party members of the Oklahoma House of Representatives
Oklahoma lawyers
People from Mount Carmel, Illinois
Oklahoma City University alumni
Oklahoma City University School of Law alumni
20th-century American lawyers